Vladimír Faič (born 15 July 1948 in Tekovské Lužany) is a Slovak politician, long-term member  of the National Council.

Vladimír Faič is originally a forester by profession. After graduation from the Higher School of Politics, a communist regime educational institute for cadres of working class background, he became a political functionary on the local level and graduated in Law from the Comenius University. After the Velvet Revolution, he became one of the co-founders of the Party of the Democratic Left. Between 1998 and 2002 he represented this party in the National Council.

After the end of his parliamentary mandate, Faič became active in the Direction – Slovak Social Democracy. He founded the Analysis-Strategy-Alternatives (ASA) party think tank. Since 2012, Faič has been a member of the National Council for Direction – Slovak Social Democracy. In addition to being an MP, he served as the Chairman of the Council of advisor for all governments of Robert Fico and Peter Pellegrini.

References 

Direction – Social Democracy politicians
Party of the Democratic Left (Slovakia) politicians
Slovak politicians
Living people
1948 births
Members of the National Council (Slovakia) 1998-2002
Members of the National Council (Slovakia) 2006-2010
Members of the National Council (Slovakia) 2010-2012
Members of the National Council (Slovakia) 2012-2016
Members of the National Council (Slovakia) 2016-2020
Members of the National Council (Slovakia) 2020-present
People from Levice District